The spotted moray eel (Gymnothorax isingteena) is a moray eel found in coral reefs in the Pacific and Indian Oceans. It was first named by John Richardson in 1845.

References

External links
 

isingteena
Fish described in 1845